Kaspars Saulietis (born June 12, 1987) is a Latvian ice hockey right winger, currently playing for Dinamo Riga of the Kontinental Hockey League.

External links

1987 births
Living people
Des Moines Buccaneers players
Dinamo Riga players
Expatriate ice hockey players in Canada
Expatriate ice hockey players in Russia
HC Dinamo Minsk players
HC Litvínov players
HK Neman Grodno players
HPK players
Kelowna Rockets players
HC Nové Zámky players
HK Riga 2000 players
Latvian ice hockey right wingers
Latvian expatriate sportspeople in Canada
Latvian expatriate sportspeople in Russia
Metallurg Zhlobin players
Regina Pats players
Sokil Kyiv players
Ice hockey people from Riga
Yunost Minsk players
Latvian expatriate sportspeople in the Czech Republic
Expatriate ice hockey players in the Czech Republic
Latvian expatriate sportspeople in the United States
Latvian expatriate sportspeople in Belarus
Latvian expatriate sportspeople in Finland
Latvian expatriate sportspeople in Ukraine
Latvian expatriate sportspeople in Slovakia
Expatriate ice hockey players in the United States
Expatriate ice hockey players in Belarus
Expatriate ice hockey players in Finland
Expatriate ice hockey players in Ukraine
Expatriate ice hockey players in Slovakia
Latvian expatriate ice hockey people